Ohio's 12th senatorial district has been based in rural western Ohio. It comprises the counties of Allen, Mercer, Shelby, Champaign as well as portions of Auglaize, Darke and Logan counties.  It encompasses Ohio House districts 4, 84 and 85.  It has a Cook PVI of R+14.  Its Ohio Senator is Republican Matt Huffman.  He resides in Lima, a city located in Allen County.

Former senator Keith Faber served as Senate President from 2013 to 2016.

List of senators

References

External links
Ohio's 12th district senator at the 130th Ohio General Assembly official website

Ohio State Senate districts